Serpan Peak is a small peak in Antarctica, 1,445 m, surmounting Washington Escarpment just west of Rivas Peaks in the Neptune Range, Pensacola Mountains. It was mapped by the United States Geological Survey (USGS) from surveys and U.S. Navy air photos from 1956 to 1966. It was named by the Advisory Committee on Antarctic Names (US-ACAN) for Robert D. Serpan, an aerologist with the Neptune Range field party of 1963–64.

Mountains of Queen Elizabeth Land
Pensacola Mountains